Sujit Kumar (7 February 1934 – 5 February 2010) was an Indian actor and producer. He appeared in over 150 Hindi films in the 1960s through the 1990s, and in at least 20 Bhojpuri films. Sujit played the major lead actor in many films in Bhojpuri cinema whereas in Hindi films he played pivotal roles either as a villain or as a character actor. One of his most memorable screen appearances was of a friend playing the mouth organ while driving a jeep as Rajesh Khanna courted Sharmila Tagore in the 1969 film Aradhana . Beginning in the late 1980s through the 2000s, Sujit primarily worked as a film producer.

Biography

Hindi cinema
Sujit was the leading man in suspense flicks in Hindi in the early 1960s, like in Lal Bangla (1966) and Ek Saal Pehle (1965). He was often part of films with Rajesh Khanna as the lead hero, like in Aradhana, Ittefaq, Aan Milo Sajna, Haathi Mere Saathi, Amar Prem, Mere Jeevan Saathi, Roti, Mehbooba, Avtaar, Aakhir Kyon? and Amrit.

His other notable roles include that of a spy in Ramanand Sagar's Aankein (1968), Naya Raasta (1970), Jugnu (1973), Hamrahi (1974), Charas (1976), Dharamveer (1977), Dev Anand's Des Pardes, The Burning Train, Kaamchor, Krantiveer, Tiranga and many more. Sujit produced small budget movies like Asmaan Se Ooncha (1989) in the 1980s and then subsequently bigger budget films later like Daraar (1996), and Champion.

His best friends from the film industry were, Jeetendra and Rakesh Roshan, the two with whom Sujit used to hit the gym regularly. Other close friends included producer Saawan Kumar Tak and Randhir Kapoor, all of whom practically grew up together in the Hindi Film industry since the early 1960s.

Bhojpuri cinema
He appeared in such films as Bidesiya, Loha Singh, Dangal, Pan Khaye Saiyya Hamar, Champa Chameli, Patoh Bitiya, Sajan Kare Kanyadan, Bairi Bhaile Hamar , Nag Panchami, Saiyya Se Bhaile Milanawa, Aaeel Basant Bahar, Bidhana Nach Nachawe, Mai Ke Lal, Sampurna Teerth Yatra, Sajai Da Maang Hamar, Saiyya Magan Pahalwani Me, Ganga Kahe Pukar Ke, Ganga Jaisan Bhauji Hamar and Ganga Hamar Mai.

Death
Kumar died in 2010 of cancer, an illness from which he was suffering since 2007. His wife, Kiran Singh predeceased him in 2005; they have two children, son Jatin Kumar, a film producer, and a daughter Henna Singh. A condolence meeting took place on 8 February 2010, at the Indian Medical Association, beside PVR Cinema, Juhu, Mumbai where many of his friends from the industry, like members of the Kapoor family, Rakesh Roshan's family, and Rajesh Khanna's family paid their last respects.

Filmography

Hindi

Producer
1986 : Anubhav
1989 : Aasmaan se Ooncha
1992 : Khel
1996: Daraar
2000: Champion
2004 : Aetbaar
1991 : Ganga Kahe Pukar Ke
He also acted in Zee horror show's episode Dahshat 1994-1995

References

External links
 (as actor) Note that, as at 13 July 2010, IMDB has two records for the person identified in the IndianExpress obituary as one person

1934 births
2010 deaths
Deaths from cancer in India
20th-century Indian male actors
Male actors in Bhojpuri cinema
Male actors from Mumbai
Male actors in Hindi cinema